Wild Nights! Stories about the last days of Poe, Dickinson, Twain, James and Hemingway is a collection of short stories by Joyce Carol Oates. As the title suggests, the stories are about the final days in the lives of authors Edgar Allan Poe, Emily Dickinson, Mark Twain, Henry James and Ernest Hemingway. It was published in April 2008 by Ecco.

References

2008 short story collections
Cultural depictions of Edgar Allan Poe
Cultural depictions of Emily Dickinson
Cultural depictions of Mark Twain
Cultural depictions of Ernest Hemingway
Cultural depictions of Henry James
HarperCollins books